Foster Alexander Dunlap (August 26, 1905 - January 23, 1978) was a Republican lawyer and politician from Philadelphia who served as City Controller from 1954 to 1958.

Dunlap was born in Conshohocken, Pennsylvania, in 1905, the son of Alexander and Estella Dunlap. The family moved to North Philadelphia, where Dunlap was raised. He graduated from Temple University and later from that university's law school in 1934. He later studied at the University of Pennsylvania's Wharton School. Dunlap joined the United States Army in World War II and fought in the North Africa campaign. He married Evelyn Gordon, with whom he had two children.

In 1953, Dunlap ran for the Republican nomination for Philadelphia City Controller. The primary was complicated by a split in the party hierarchy between the "regular" faction, led by  Republican City Committee chairman William J. Hamilton, and Board of Revision of Taxes President William F. Meade; and an insurgent faction led by former Sheriff Austin Meehan. An independent slate of Republicans headed by Treasurer candidate George W. Gibson also contested the primary. Dunlap was the Hamilton-Meade candidate, and won with 66,557 votes. Meehan's candidate, former Deputy Secretary of Supplies and Services Wilhelm F. Knauer, polled 50,185, and Gibson's running mate, Rudolph F. Price, tallied just 4,566.

In the general election, Dunlap faced Democratic nominee Roland R. Randall. He highlighted the importance of having a Controller from a different party from the mayor, Democrat Joseph S. Clark, Jr., and noted that Clark and his running mate Richardson Dilworth had said the same thing in 1949, when the mayor had been a Republican. Dunlap won with 51% of the vote.

The City Controller sits at the head of an independent auditing department, approves all payments made out of the city treasury, and audits the executive departments. As an independently elected official, the Controller is not responsible to the mayor or the city council and was given expanded powers under the 1951 Charter. Dunlap took office in 1954 and set to work right away in questioning city expenditures that he believed violated procurement policies. He also circulated a questionnaire to city employees asking whether they were members of any "subversive" organizations.

In 1955, at Clark's urging, Dunlap investigated Philadelphia's Traffic Court and found widespread favoritism that he claimed amounted to $1.9 million in fines not being collected. The following year, as Democrats on city council announced plans to amend the 1951 City Charter to allow more political patronage in city jobs, Dunlap voiced his opposition to the plan.

Dunlap was unopposed for renomination in the 1957 election. His vigilance in his duties may have harmed his reelection chances; according to a Philadelphia Inquirer story just before the election, some Republican ward leaders withheld their support for Dunlap because he had investigated corruption of Republican officials. Whatever the reason, he went down to defeat, losing to Democrat Alexander Hemphill. Dunlap returned to his private law practice and moved to Cherry Hill, New Jersey, where he died in 1978. He was buried in Saint Peter Evangelical Lutheran Church Cemetery in Lafayette Hill, Pennsylvania.

References

Sources

 
 
 
 
 
 
 
 
 
 
 
 
 
 
 
 

1905 births
1978 deaths
20th-century American lawyers
20th-century American politicians
Pennsylvania Republicans
Temple University Beasley School of Law alumni